Naturally occurring vanadium (23V) is composed of one stable isotope 51V and one radioactive isotope 50V with a half-life of 1.5×1017 years. 24 artificial radioisotopes have been characterized (in the range of mass number between 40 and 65) with the most stable being 49V with a half-life of 330 days, and 48V with a half-life of 15.9735 days.  All of the remaining radioactive isotopes have half-lives shorter than an hour, the majority of them below 10 seconds, the least stable being 42V with a half-life shorter than 55 nanoseconds, with all of the isotopes lighter than it, and none of the heavier, have unknown half-lives. In 4 isotopes, metastable excited states were found (including 2 metastable states for 60V), which adds up to 5 meta states.

The primary decay mode before the most abundant stable isotope 51V is electron capture. The next most common mode is beta decay. The primary decay products before 51V are element 22 (titanium) isotopes and the primary products after are element 24 (chromium) isotopes.

List of isotopes 

|-
| 40V
| style="text-align:right" | 23
| style="text-align:right" | 17
| 40.01109(54)#
|
| p
| 39Ti
| 2−#
|
|
|-
| 41V
| style="text-align:right" | 23
| style="text-align:right" | 18
| 40.99978(22)#
|
| p
| 40Ti
| 7/2−#
|
|
|-
| 42V
| style="text-align:right" | 23
| style="text-align:right" | 19
| 41.99123(21)#
| <55 ns
| p
| 41Ti
| 2−#
|
|
|-
| 43V
| style="text-align:right" | 23
| style="text-align:right" | 20
| 42.98065(25)#
| 80# ms
| β+
| 43Ti
| 7/2−#
|
|
|-
| rowspan=2|44V
| rowspan=2 style="text-align:right" | 23
| rowspan=2 style="text-align:right" | 21
| rowspan=2|43.97411(13)
| rowspan=2|111(7) ms
| β+ (>99.9%)
| 44Ti
| rowspan=2|(2+)
| rowspan=2|
| rowspan=2|
|-
| β+, α (<.1%)
| 40Ca
|-
| style="text-indent:1em" | 44mV
| colspan="3" style="text-indent:2em" | 270(100)# keV
| 150(3) ms
| β+
| 44Ti
| (6+)
|
|
|-
| 45V
| style="text-align:right" | 23
| style="text-align:right" | 22
| 44.965776(18)
| 547(6) ms
| β+
| 45Ti
| 7/2−
|
|
|-
| 46V
| style="text-align:right" | 23
| style="text-align:right" | 23
| 45.9602005(11)
| 422.50(11) ms
| β+
| 46Ti
| 0+
|
|
|-
| style="text-indent:1em" | 46mV
| colspan="3" style="text-indent:2em" | 801.46(10) keV
| 1.02(7) ms
| IT
| 46V
| 3+
|
|
|-
| 47V
| style="text-align:right" | 23
| style="text-align:right" | 24
| 46.9549089(9)
| 32.6(3) min
| β+
| 47Ti
| 3/2−
|
|
|-
| 48V
| style="text-align:right" | 23
| style="text-align:right" | 25
| 47.9522537(27)
| 15.9735(25) d
| β+
| 48Ti
| 4+
|
|
|-
| 49V
| style="text-align:right" | 23
| style="text-align:right" | 26
| 48.9485161(12)
| 329(3) d
| EC
| 49Ti
| 7/2−
|
|
|-
| rowspan=2|50V
| rowspan=2 style="text-align:right" | 23
| rowspan=2 style="text-align:right" | 27
| rowspan=2|49.9471585(11)
| rowspan=2|1.4(4)×1017 y
| EC (83%)
| 50Ti
| rowspan=2|6+
| rowspan=2|0.00250(4)
| rowspan=2|0.002487–0.002502
|-
| β− (17%)
| 50Cr
|-
| 51V
| style="text-align:right" | 23
| style="text-align:right" | 28
| 50.9439595(11)
| colspan=3 align=center|Stable
| 7/2−
| 0.99750(4)
| 0.997498–0.997513
|See V-51 nuclear magnetic resonance
|-
| 52V
| style="text-align:right" | 23
| style="text-align:right" | 29
| 51.9447755(11)
| 3.743(5) min
| β−
| 52Cr
| 3+
| 
| 
|-
| 53V
| style="text-align:right" | 23
| style="text-align:right" | 30
| 52.944338(3)
| 1.60(4) min
| β−
| 53Cr
| 7/2−
|
|
|-
| 54V
| style="text-align:right" | 23
| style="text-align:right" | 31
| 53.946440(16)
| 49.8(5) s
| β−
| 54Cr
| 3+
|
|
|-
| style="text-indent:1em" | 54mV
| colspan="3" style="text-indent:2em" | 108(3) keV
| 900(500) ns
|
|
| (5+)
|
|
|-
| 55V
| style="text-align:right" | 23
| style="text-align:right" | 32
| 54.94723(11)
| 6.54(15) s
| β−
| 55Cr
| (7/2−)#
|
|
|-
| rowspan=2|56V
| rowspan=2 style="text-align:right" | 23
| rowspan=2 style="text-align:right" | 33
| rowspan=2|55.95053(22)
| rowspan=2|216(4) ms
| β− (>99.9%)
| 56Cr
| rowspan=2|(1+)
| rowspan=2|
| rowspan=2|
|-
| β−, n
| 55Cr
|-
| rowspan=2|57V
| rowspan=2 style="text-align:right" | 23
| rowspan=2 style="text-align:right" | 34
| rowspan=2|56.95256(25)
| rowspan=2|0.35(1) s
| β− (>99.9%)
| 57Cr
| rowspan=2|(3/2−)
| rowspan=2|
| rowspan=2|
|-
| β−, n (<.1%)
| 56Cr
|-
| rowspan=2|58V
| rowspan=2 style="text-align:right" | 23
| rowspan=2 style="text-align:right" | 35
| rowspan=2|57.95683(27)
| rowspan=2|191(8) ms
| β− (>99.9%)
| 58Cr
| rowspan=2|3+#
| rowspan=2|
| rowspan=2|
|-
| β−, n (<.1%)
| 57Cr
|-
| rowspan=2|59V
| rowspan=2 style="text-align:right" | 23
| rowspan=2 style="text-align:right" | 36
| rowspan=2|58.96021(33)
| rowspan=2|75(7) ms
| β− (>99.9%)
| 59Cr
| rowspan=2|7/2−#
| rowspan=2|
| rowspan=2|
|-
| β−, n (<.1%)
| 58Cr
|-
| rowspan=2|60V
| rowspan=2 style="text-align:right" | 23
| rowspan=2 style="text-align:right" | 37
| rowspan=2|59.96503(51)
| rowspan=2|122(18) ms
| β− (>99.9%)
| 60Cr
| rowspan=2|3+#
| rowspan=2|
| rowspan=2|
|-
| β−, n (<.1%)
| 59Cr
|-
| style="text-indent:1em" | 60m1V
| colspan="3" style="text-indent:2em" | 0(150)# keV
| 40(15) ms
|
|
| 1+#
|
|
|-
| style="text-indent:1em" | 60m2V
| colspan="3" style="text-indent:2em" | 101(1) keV
| >400 ns
|
|
|
|
|
|-
| 61V
| style="text-align:right" | 23
| style="text-align:right" | 38
| 60.96848(43)#
| 47.0(12) ms
| β−
| 61Cr
| 7/2−#
|
|
|-
| 62V
| style="text-align:right" | 23
| style="text-align:right" | 39
| 61.97378(54)#
| 33.5(20) ms
| β−
| 62Cr
| 3+#
|
|
|-
| 63V
| style="text-align:right" | 23
| style="text-align:right" | 40
| 62.97755(64)#
| 17(3) ms
| β−
| 63Cr
| (7/2−)#
|
|
|-
| 64V
| style="text-align:right" | 23
| style="text-align:right" | 41
| 63.98347(75)#
| 10# ms [>300 ns]
|
|
|
|
|
|-
| 65V
| style="text-align:right" | 23
| style="text-align:right" | 42
| 64.98792(86)#
| 10# ms
|
|
| 5/2−#
|
|
|-
| rowspan=3|66V
| rowspan=3 style="text-align:right" | 23
| rowspan=3 style="text-align:right" | 43
| rowspan=3|65.99324(54)#
| rowspan=3|10# ms (>620 ns)
| β−?
| 66Cr
| rowspan=3|
| rowspan=3|
| rowspan=3|
|-
| β−, n?
| 65Cr
|-
| β−, 2n?
| 64Cr
|-
| rowspan=3|67V
| rowspan=3 style="text-align:right" | 23
| rowspan=3 style="text-align:right" | 44
| rowspan=3|66.99813(64)#
| rowspan=3|8# ms (>620 ns)
| β−?
| 67Cr
| rowspan=3| 5/2−#
| rowspan=3|
| rowspan=3|
|-
| β−, n?
| 66Cr
|-
| β−, 2n?
| 65Cr

References 

 Isotope masses from:

 Isotopic compositions and standard atomic masses from:

 Half-life, spin, and isomer data selected from the following sources.

  History of discovery: A. Shore, A. Fritsch, M. Heim, A. Schuh, M. Thoennessen. Discovery of the Vanadium Isotopes. arXiv:0907.1994 (2009).

 
Vanadium
Vanadium